In the Name of the Law is a 1932 French crime film directed by Maurice Tourneur and starring Marcelle Chantal, Régine Dancourt and Gabriel Gabrio. It was based on a novel by Paul Bringuier. The film was well received by critics. Variety considered Marcelle Chantal's performance "her best so far in talkers".

Synopsis
After the discovery of a murdered police inspector's body in the River Seine, two of his colleagues pursue a beautiful lady, involved with a drug smuggling ring based in the South of France, who they believe responsible for the killing.

Cast
 Marcelle Chantal as Sandra 
 Régine Dancourt as Mireille 
 Gabriel Gabrio as Amédée 
 Jean Marchat as Marcel 
 Jean Dax as Chevalier 
 José Noguéro as Gonzalès 
 Harry Nestor as Comte de Bullack 
 Pierre Labry as Ludovic 
 Geo Laby as Clamart 
 Charles Vanel as Lancelot

References

Bibliography
 Waldman, Harry. Maurice Tourneur: The Life and Films. McFarland, 2008.

External links

1932 films
1932 crime films
French crime films
1930s French-language films
Films about lawyers
Films directed by Maurice Tourneur
Films based on French novels
Films set in Marseille
Films set in Paris
French black-and-white films
Pathé films
1930s French films